The Dynamo Shooting Range is a firing range located in Mytishchi in the then Eastern Planning Zone of Moscow, Russia. Constructed in 1957 and renovated in 1979, it hosted the shooting and the shooting part of the modern pentathlon events for the 1980 Summer Olympics.

References
1980 Summer Olympics official report. Volume 2. Part 1. pp. 118–21.

Venues of the 1980 Summer Olympics
Olympic modern pentathlon venues
Olympic shooting venues
Shooting ranges in Russia
Sports venues built in the Soviet Union
Sports venues in Moscow
Sports venue
Mytishchinsky District
1957 establishments in Russia
1957 in Soviet sport
Venues of the Friendship Games